Prestonville is a home rule-class city located at the confluence of the Ohio and Kentucky rivers in Carroll County, Kentucky, in the United States. It lies across the Kentucky River from Carrollton. The population was 161 at the 2010 U.S. Census.

History
The site of the present city was originally part of a grant of several thousand acres to Col. William Preston of Virginia for his service during the American Revolution. The town was chartered in 1797. A post office operated from 1844 to 1849; another was opened nearby in 1880 and called Wideawake prior to its removal to Prestonville in 1893. The city was incorporated in 1867.

Geography
Prestonville is located at  (38.678883, -85.191396).

Demographics

As of the census of 2000, there were 164 people, 62 households, and 43 families residing in the city. The racial makeup of the city was 95.73% White, 0.61% African American, 0.61% Native American, 1.22% from other races, and 1.83% from two or more races. Hispanic or Latino of any race were 3.66% of the population.

There were 62 households, out of which 35.5% had children under the age of 18 living with them, 53.2% were married couples living together, 9.7% had a female householder with no husband present, and 30.6% were non-families. 22.6% of all households were made up of individuals, and 1.6% had someone living alone who was 65 years of age or older. The average household size was 2.65 and the average family size was 3.12.

In the city, the population was spread out, with 27.4% under the age of 18, 11.0% from 18 to 24, 34.1% from 25 to 44, 21.3% from 45 to 64, and 6.1% who were 65 years of age or older. The median age was 35 years. For every 100 females, there were 107.6 males. For every 100 females age 18 and over, there were 101.7 males.

The median income for a household in the city was $28,250, and the median income for a family was $30,341. Males had a median income of $23,125 versus $19,375 for females. The per capita income for the city was $12,267. About 14.9% of families and 17.7% of the population were below the poverty line, including 13.6% of those under the age of eighteen and none of those 65 or over.

See also
 List of cities and towns along the Ohio River

References

Cities in Carroll County, Kentucky
Cities in Kentucky
Kentucky populated places on the Ohio River